Roger I. Villarreal Deago (born 21 June 1977 in Monagrillo, Panama) is a baseball player who last played professionally in 2008. He played in Major League Baseball for the San Diego Padres in 2003, and has also played in numerous international baseball events as well.

Professional baseball
Deago played for Technika Brno in Brno, Czech Republic before signing as an amateur free agent by the Padres in 2002, and in 2003 he made his Major League debut. He spent most of the 2003 season with the Mobile BayBears, going 8–7 with a 4.03 ERA in 26 games (20 starts) with them. On May 10, 2003, he made his big league debut against the New York Mets. He pitched well in his first big league game, allowing two runs on five hits and three walks in six innings of work, coming away with a no-decision. He pitched poorly against the Atlanta Braves in his next start on May 15, allowing seven earned runs in 4 innings of work. That would be the final game of his big league career. Overall, he went 0–1 with a 7.84 ERA in his big league career.

Although Deago's big league career was over after only two games, he continued to play professionally for several years. In 2004, he pitched for the Lake Elsinore Storm, BayBears and Portland Beavers, going a combined 3–2 with a 2.00 ERA in 20 games (eight starts). He pitched for the BayBears and Beavers in 2005, going a combined 1–2 with a 5.40 ERA in five starts. For the BayBears and Beavers in 2006, Deago went a combined 10–8 with a 4.49 ERA in 28 games (21 starts). He played for the Beavers and San Antonio Missions in 2007, going a combined 6–8 with a 5.13 ERA in 35 games (21 starts). He ended up in the Tampa Bay Rays organization in 2008, and he pitched for their Double-A team, the Montgomery Biscuits. That season, he went 2–5 with a 2.95 ERA in 59 relief appearances.

In 2011, Deago returned to the Czech Republic to play for Technika Brno.

International competition
In the 2001 Baseball World Cup, Deago was 1–1 with a 4.08 ERA. He went 2–0 with 19 strikeouts and a  1.29 ERA in 14 innings of work in the 2002 Intercontinental Cup. During the Confederación Panamericana de Béisbol qualifiers for the 2008 Olympics, Deago allowed three runs in 11 innings - however, Panama failed to advance to the Olympics. He appeared in two games in the 2006 World Baseball Classic, pitching 1 innings and allowing three hits and two runs (neither of them were earned). He posted a 0.00 ERA.

References

External links
, or Retrosheet

1977 births
Living people
Águilas de Mexicali players
Expatriate baseball players in the Czech Republic
Lake Elsinore Storm players
Leones del Caracas players
Panamanian expatriate baseball players in Venezuela
Major League Baseball pitchers
Major League Baseball players from Panama
Mexican League baseball pitchers
Mobile BayBears players
Montgomery Biscuits players
Panamanian expatriate baseball players in Mexico
Panamanian expatriate baseball players in the United States
Portland Beavers players
San Antonio Missions players
San Diego Padres players
Toros de Tijuana players
2006 World Baseball Classic players